Christ Church Cathedral, Waterford, or more formally, the Cathedral of The Holy Trinity, Christ Church, is a cathedral of the Church of Ireland in Waterford City, Ireland. It is in the ecclesiastical province of Dublin. Previously the cathedral of the Diocese of Waterford, it is now one of six cathedrals in the United Dioceses of Cashel and Ossory.

Ecclesiastical history
The first church on the site was built in the 11th century. In 1170 it was the venue for the marriage of Richard de Clare, 2nd Earl of Pembroke ("Strongbow"), and Aoife Ní Diarmait. This was replaced in 1210 by a Gothic Cathedral. Since Christ Church Cathedral was subject to the Protestant Reformation, Roman Catholic adherents were consequently obliged to worship elsewhere.
 
In the 18th century, the city corporation recommended that the bishop erect a new building. The architect was John Roberts, who was responsible also for the Catholic cathedral and for much of Georgian Waterford.

During the demolition of the old cathedral, a series of medieval vestments were discovered in 1773. They were presented by the then Anglican bishop, the Rt Revd Richard Chenevix, to his Roman Catholic counterpart, the Most Revd Peter Creagh, and are now kept in the Museum of Treasures in Waterford and the National Museum in Dublin.

The present building has been described by architectural historian Mark Girouard as the finest 18th century ecclesiastical building in Ireland.

Burials
Michael Boyle (the elder), Bishop of Waterford and Lismore (1619-1635)

See also
Bishop of Waterford
Bishop of Waterford and Lismore
Bishop of Cashel and Waterford
Bishop of Cashel and Ossory
Dean of Waterford

References

Anglican cathedrals in the Republic of Ireland
Diocese of Cashel and Ossory
Churches in Waterford (city)
Tourist attractions in Waterford (city)
Neoclassical church buildings in Ireland